Carry the Fire is the fourth studio album by Dustin Kensrue. Vagrant Records alongside Staple Records released the album on April 21, 2015.

Critical reception

Signaling in a four star review by Alternative Press, Brian Shultz realizes, "It’s a robust and decidedly enjoyable affair with  production... similarly rollicking pacing, memorable melodies, stylistically variant characteristics and lots of loving odes to his wife." Dan H., indicating in a four out of five review from Sputnikmusic, recognizes, "If you find pleasure in dissecting an artist’s lyrics then you’re going to find little to satiate your thirst, but if you’re content to roll along with the upbeat rhythms instead, then Carry the Fire will reward you." Specifying in a five star review at Christian Review Magazine, Leah St. John writes, "truly ... a superb release, both musically and lyrically." Scott Fryberger, awarding the album four and a half stars from Jesus Freak Hideout, states, "A worthy follow-up". Writing a four star review for Indie Vision Music, Ian Zandi says, "It may not be a perfect record but it is wholly satisfying."

Track listing

Charts

References

2015 albums
Vagrant Records albums